ArteCombo is a wind quintet formed in 2007. Its members are: Mayu Sato (flute), Baptiste Gibier (oboe), Annelise Clément (clarinet), Cyril Normand (french horn), and Frank Sibold (bassoon).

Beside the traditional wind quintet repertoire (Ligeti, Hindemith, Françaix, etc.), ArteCombo plays its own arrangements (written by Frank Sibold) of pieces such as Gershwin’s An American in Paris. Composer Jean-Philippe Calvin wrote the wind quintet "Kleztet" for Artecombo. ArteCombo also commissioned and performed the musical children story "Caravane Gazelle", composed by Olivier Calmel.

ArteCombo won the second prize at the Henri Tomasi International Woodwind Quintet Competition in Marseille in 2011. Until now, ArteCombo has played mostly in France and Japan.

Discography
 2010: Caravane Gazelle, Hybrid'Music, with Julie Martigny (voc)
 2011:  Carnet de route, Hybrid'Music

References

External links
 Official website

Wind quintets
Musical groups established in 2007